Mile is a county-level city located in Honghe Hani and Yi Autonomous Prefecture, Yunnan province, China. It is named after the Maitreya Buddha, for which there was a temple located on a nearby mountain, making it the only city in China named after The Buddha. It is a center for sugar and tobacco production in Yunnan.

History 
Mile has been known since at least 116 BC in written history. In 1290 it was established as a prefecture and in 1770 as a county.

It is the birthplace of Ming dynasty politician Yang Shengwu (杨绳武), Qing dynasty merchant Wang Chi (:zh:王炽) and Republic era general Zhang Chong and mathematician Xiong Qinglai.

In 2014, Mile County was upgraded as a county level city.

Administrative divisions
In the present, Mile City has 10 towns and 2 townships. 
10 towns

2 townships
 Wushan
 Jiangbian

Demographics
Mile has a population of 570,100 as of 2021, including 44.9% ethnic minorities.

The Mile County Gazetteer 弥勒县志 (1987:689-699) reports the following Yi subgroups.
Axi 阿细 (Xishan Yi)
Azhe 阿哲: in Wushan 五山, Xunjian 巡检, and Jianbian 江边 districts
Awu 阿乌: 8,710 persons as of 1984
Black Yi 黑彝: in Wushan 五山, Xishan 西山, and Dongshan 东山 districts
Large Black Yi 大黑彝 subgroup (autonym: Nasubo 纳苏波)
Small Black Yi 小黑彝 subgroup
Sani 撒尼 (autonym: Sanibo 撒尼波)
White Yi 白彝
Nasubo 纳苏波 subgroup: in Dongshan 东山 and Xinshao 新哨 districts
White Yi 白彝 subgroup: in Xier District 西二区
Gebo 葛波 (exonym: Guzu 古族)
The local Yi people have a ceremony to worship their fire god once a year.

Climate

References

External links
Mile County

County-level divisions of Honghe Prefecture
Cities in Yunnan